Yeşilyurt is a town and district of Tokat Province in the Black Sea region of Turkey. The mayor is Kazım Misafir (AKP).

References

External links
District governor's official website 

Populated places in Tokat Province
Districts of Tokat Province
Towns in Turkey